Pålsson is a Swedish-language surname. Notable people with the surname include:

Adam Pålsson, (born  1988), Swedish actor and musician
Anders Pålsson (born 1948), Swedish businessman
Anne-Marie Pålsson, Swedish politician
Chatrine Pålsson Ahlgren, Swedish politician
Eric Pålsson Mullica, early Finnish settler to New Sweden
Göran Printz-Påhlson (1931-2006), Swedish poet , literary critic , translator 
, Swedish pianist and professor
 (1870-1951), Swedish farmer and politician, MP
Lars Pålsson Syll Swedish economist and professor
 (1933-2010) Swedish lawyer and professor
Margareta Pålsson (born 1949), Swedish politician
Per Pålsson  (1828-1914), Swedish murderer
Sten Pålsson Swedish footballer

Fictional characters
Morgan Pålsson, a fictional reported from Swedish comedies  and Hipphipp!

Swedish-language surnames
Surnames from given names